CKDM (730 CKDM), is a commercial AM radio station located in Dauphin, Manitoba, voted Broadcast Dialogue's Canadian Small Market Station Of The Year in 2021. Owned by Dauphin Broadcasting, the station airs a mix of country, adult contemporary, community information and some religious programming.

CKDM broadcasts with a power of 10,000 watts daytime, 5,000 watts night-time; the signal is non-directional daytime, but uses a two-tower directional antenna night-time.

History 
Throughout its history, CKDM-AM has been owned by Dauphin Broadcasting Ltd.

Dauphin Broadcasting applied for a license in 1950, but was denied. After failing to receive a license from the CBC in 1950, another application for a broadcast license was approved in 1951 on 1230kHz with 250 watts. Its first air date was on January 5, 1951.
A move to 1050kHz with 1000 watts was made in 1956.

In 1958, a further move to 730kHz was made where the station has remained ever since.

In 1960, a 10,000 watt transmitter was purchased from Canadian Marconi Sales, though the increased power was not used until later in the decade.

In 1966, a power increase to 10,000 watts was made.

In 2015, CKDM moved out of its downtown studio, a location they had since 1951 and moved further away, to 1735 Main Street South. They also bought a new transmitter.

References

External links

Kdm
Kdm
Kdm
Dauphin, Manitoba
Radio stations established in 1951
1951 establishments in Manitoba